The Treaty Between the Slovak Republic and the Holy See on Catholic Education is a treaty between the Slovak Republic and the Holy See about Catholic upbringing and education.

This treaty, or concordat, secured full state funding for Church-controlled schools and Catholic religious education. It was signed between the Holy See and Slovakia on May 13, 2004, and came into effect on July 9, 2004.

References

Bibliography
Concordat Watch - Slovakia

2004 in Slovakia
2004
Treaties concluded in 2004
Treaties of Slovakia